Daddy's Home 2 (titled on screen as Daddy's Home Two)  is a 2017 American Christmas buddy comedy film directed by Sean Anders and written by Anders and John Morris. A sequel to Daddy's Home (2015), it stars Will Ferrell, Mark Wahlberg, Linda Cardellini, John Cena, with John Lithgow and Mel Gibson. The plot follows now-reformed fathers Brad and Dusty (Ferrell and Wahlberg), now co-parenting Dusty's kids, who have to deal with their own fathers (Lithgow and Gibson) visiting for the holidays.

Unlike its predecessor, Red Granite Pictures was not involved in the film's production. Principal photography on the film began in Massachusetts in March 2017 and it was released in the United States by Paramount Pictures on November 10, 2017. Although the film received generally negative reviews from critics, it grossed over $180 million worldwide against a production budget of $69–70 million.

Plot
Finally friends, Brad Whitaker and Dusty Mayron co-parent Dusty's two children, Megan and Dylan, who take turns at each father's house. Dusty has remarried to Karen, a doctor/novelist, and is stepfather to her daughter Adrianna. The men decide to have a joint Christmas rather than separate ones, after Megan embarrassingly admits during a school recital, that she does not like Christmas anymore due to the stress and embarrassment caused by the dual arrangement. She'd prefer one "together Christmas".

Dusty's tough fighter pilot/Space Shuttle astronaut father Kurt and Brad's overbearing and cheerful father, Don, unexpectedly arrive for Christmas. Megan and Dylan warmly embrace Don, as he is very present in their lives, while Kurt hasn't seen them since they were toddlers. From his envy of the affection the children show Don, Kurt rents a large cabin through Airbnb, to house them all through the holiday week.

Brad and Dusty's co-parenting is put to the test by Kurt's meddling. Dusty’s beef with Kurt mainly stems from the fact that he was rarely there for him as a child. Especially painful was when, during a youth Glee Club recital he embarrassed himself by missing his solo part when Kurt left to make out with a woman during his part. Sara, meanwhile, tries to bond with Karen, but is appalled by her shoplifting clothes from a store and not caring if Adriana and Megan drink alcoholic eggnog. She later becomes concerned Don isn’t with his wife, whom he claims couldn’t come as she was staying home to take care of her ill brother.

Dylan develops a crush on a little girl staying in the cabin next door, causing Megan and Adrianna to constantly tease him in front of her. Brad gives him some “advice", and Dusty interjects when he thinks Brad is having what looks like “the talk” with Dylan, although they had agreed to do it together. As the trees on the Christmas tree farm are small, Kurt suggests they illegally go on to private property to cut one down. Brad mistakes a cell tower for a tree and is electrocuted.

After bowling, the family takes the kids to see Santa. There, Kurt tries to convince Dylan to ask Santa for a shotgun, but Don talks him out of it. Megan, however, wants one instead and is granted permission after Kurt makes a sexist comment. Out hunting the next day, Megan accidentally shoots Kurt in the shoulder, sending him to the hospital. While Kurt is down, she shoots two turkeys, surprising him. Sara confronts Brad over Don’s odd behavior, but he refuses to believe her.

Brad, Dusty, Don and Kurt go to an improv comedy club, where they have a good time until Kurt picking up a woman at the bar annoys Dusty. Brad enters Don into the improv show, and Dusty chooses the topic of a husband confronting his cheating wife as the subject of the skit. As it progresses, it is revealed that Don has separated from his wife in real life. Sara comforts Don about his divorce in front of an eggnog bowl, but when Dusty reveals his part in the skit, Don and Brad become furious and Dusty and Brad's relationship becomes strained. When they leave, Megan and Adrianna sneak cups of alcoholic eggnog. Brad, attempting to get back at Dusty, invites Adrianna's father, Roger. Roger intimidates Dusty as he had done to Brad in the first film.

The entire family takes part in a live nativity. Brad fights with Dusty because he wants to play Joseph. A drunken Megan begins to swear, and an equally drunk Adrianna falls from her platform, then the crowd breaks up. Instead of Dusty fighting Brad, he almost fights Roger, and Don is repeatedly hit in the face with ice-balls.

On Christmas Day the families, depressed from all the arguing, pack up to leave. On their way out of town, they are forced back due to a blizzard, taking shelter at a movie theater. They see Missile Tow, a holiday action comedy film starring Liam Neeson. When the power cuts off during the movie, everyone goes to the lobby where each man confronts his father about his secrets, lies, and attitudes, and reconcile.

Remembering advice given to him by Kurt, Dylan walks toward the girl he has a crush on to kiss her, but instead kisses Adrianna. Kurt pushes Dusty to stand up to Adrianna and punish her for her recent behavior, but he instead tells her he loves her. He then tells Roger that loving Adrianna means loving her real father as well as he is also part of the family. Roger almost leaves without Adrianna. However, he has a change of heart after everyone breaks out into a song of "Do They Know It's Christmas?" (during which the power comes back on) and he decides to stay.

Sometime later, at the airport, Don and Kurt are preparing to head back to their respective homes. Adrianna, who has grown close with Don, reveals she signed him up for a dating app for seniors so he can move on from Brad’s mother. Kurt goes with Don up the terminal escalators, where he reveals to Don that he switched out the tickets and they are going to spend New Year's together in Las Vegas to find dates more effectively.

As Brad's mother arrives, Dusty and Brad discover Brad's new stepfather is Sully Sullenberger, pilot of the 2009 "Miracle on the Hudson" flight. They remember watching the film Sully together recently, and Dusty appears to be thrilled and excited to meet him. Brad seems willing to accept him, but instead runs down the terminal, screaming that Sully will never replace his father and "You only have one good story, my father has a million".

Cast

 Will Ferrell as Brad Whitaker
 Mark Wahlberg as Dusty Mayron
 Mel Gibson as Kurt Mayron
 John Lithgow as Don Whitaker
 Linda Cardellini as Sara Whitaker
 John Cena as Roger
 Scarlett Estevez as Megan Mayron
 Owen Vaccaro as Dylan Mayron
 Alessandra Ambrosio as Karen Mayron
 Didi Costine as Adrianna
 Bill Burr as Jerry
 Chesley Sullenberger as himself
 Liam Neeson as himself (voice)
 Daniel DiMaggio as Young Dusty

Production
In April 2016, the sequel was announced, with Will Ferrell and Mark Wahlberg reprising their roles, Sean Anders and John Morris writing the script, and Anders directing. In January 2017, it was reported that Mel Gibson and John Lithgow were being sought to play the main characters' fathers in the film. The two were later confirmed to star, along with Linda Cardellini, John Cena, Owen Vaccaro and Scarlett Estevez, reprising their roles.

Principal photography began on March 20, 2017. Scenes were filmed in Concord, Massachusetts, Clinton, Massachusetts, Framingham, Massachusetts, Lawrence, Massachusetts and Great Barrington, Massachusetts.

Release
The film was released in the United States on November 10, 2017.

Daddy's Home 2 was released on Digital HD on February 6, 2018, and was released on Blu-ray and DVD on February 20, 2018.

Reception

Box office
Daddy's Home 2 grossed $104 million in the United States and Canada, and $76.6 million in other territories, for a worldwide total of $180.6 million, against a production budget of  $69–70 million.

In the United States and Canada, Daddy's Home 2 opened alongside Murder on the Orient Express, and was projected to gross around $20 million from 3,575 theaters in its opening weekend. The film made $10.7 million on its first day, including $1.5 million from Thursday night previews at 2,500 theaters, up from the $1.2 million made by the first film. It went on to debut to $29.7 million, finishing second at the box office, behind holdover Thor: Ragnarok ($57 million). In its second weekend, the film made $14.4 million (a drop of 51.3%), finishing 4th behind Justice League, Wonder and Thor: Ragnarok.

Critical response
The website's critical consensus reads, "A formulaic comedy that's unlikely to spread much yuletide merriment, Daddy's Home 2 can only muster a few stray yuks from its talented cast." On Metacritic, the film has a weighted average score of 30 out of 100 based on 26 critics, indicating "generally unfavorable reviews". Audiences polled by CinemaScore gave the film an average grade of "A−" on an A+ to F scale.

Alonso Duralde of TheWrap was critical of what he described as the film's sloppiness and laziness, saying, "Director Sean Anders and his co-writer John Morris execute what are supposed to be the laughs with blunt force. The jokes announce themselves with heavy footsteps, and almost none of them land, stranding a talented cast with terrible material that they’re straining to sell." Richard Roeper of the Chicago Sun-Times gave the film 1 out of 4 stars, saying: "After enduring last week’s lousy and lazy A Bad Moms Christmas, I would have bet it would be many a year before we’d see another holiday comedy more sour and cynical and profoundly unfunny. I sit corrected."

Glenn Kenny of RogerEbert.com gave the film 2.5 out of 4 stars, writing, "I found the sequel better than the original—the writing sharper, the jokes fresher and smarter, the comic interaction between the lead characters consistently engaging. I mentioned this to my incredulous wife, who said, 'So you’re saying it's the Godfather, Part 2 of the Daddy’s Home series'."

Accolades

Possible sequel
In an interview, Mark Wahlberg mentioned that they would like to get Liam Neeson for the third installment of the film.

See also
 List of Christmas films

References

External links
 

2017 films
2010s Christmas films
2010s Christmas comedy films
American Christmas comedy films
American sequel films
Films about dysfunctional families
Films directed by Sean Anders
Films produced by Adam McKay
Films produced by John Morris
Films produced by Will Ferrell
Films scored by Michael Andrews
Films shot in Massachusetts
Golden Raspberry Award winning films
Gary Sanchez Productions films
Paramount Pictures films
Films with screenplays by John Morris
Films with screenplays by Sean Anders
2017 comedy films
Films set in a movie theatre
2010s English-language films
2010s American films